Peadar Duignan (26 July 1898 – 13 April 1955) was an Irish Fianna Fáil politician. He was elected to Dáil Éireann as a Teachta Dála (TD) for the Galway West constituency at the 1951 general election. He did not contest the 1954 general election.

References

1898 births
1955 deaths
Fianna Fáil TDs
Members of the 14th Dáil
Politicians from County Galway